The 2008 IRB Junior World Championship was the first annual international rugby union competition for Under 20 national teams. All players who were twenty years of age or under on 1 January 2008 were eligible for selection.

This competition replaced the now defunct Under 19 Rugby World Championship and Under 21 Rugby World Championship. The event, organised by rugby's governing body, the International Rugby Board (IRB), was contested by sixteen men's under-20 national teams.

The tournament was held in June and hosted by Wales, at four separate venues, and won by New Zealand.

Venues

Calendar

Pools

Pool A
{| class="wikitable"
|-
!width=165|Team
!width=40|Played
!width=40|Won
!width=40|Drawn
!width=40|Lost
!width=40|Tries
!width=40|For
!width=40|Against
!width=40|Difference
!width=40|BP
!width=40|Points
|- bgcolor=#ccffcc align=center
|align=left| 
|3||3||0||0||25||173||19||+154||3||15
|- bgcolor=#ffffcc align=center
|align=left| 
|3||2||0||1||6||47||69||–32||1||9
|- bgcolor=#ffcccc align=center
|align=left| 
|3||1||0||2||6||64||109||–45||1||5
|- align=center
|align=left| 
|3||0||0||3||3||46||123||–77||0||0
|}

Pool B
{| class="wikitable"
|-
!width=165|Team
!width=40|Played
!width=40|Won
!width=40|Drawn
!width=40|Lost
!width=40|Tries
!width=40|For
!width=40|Against
!width=40|Difference
!width=40|BP
!width=40|Points
|- bgcolor=#ccffcc align=center
|align=left| 
|3||3||0||0||27||196||32||+164||2||14
|- bgcolor=#ffffcc align=center
|align=left| 
|3||2||0||1||7||60||39||+21||1||9
|- bgcolor=#ffcccc align=center
|align=left| 
|3||1||0||2||8||61||115||–54||1||5
|- align=center
|align=left| 
|3||0||0||3||3||38||169||–131||0||0
|}

Pool C
{| class="wikitable"
|-
!width=165|Team
!width=40|Played
!width=40|Won
!width=40|Drawn
!width=40|Lost
!width=40|Tries
!width=40|For
!width=40|Against
!width=40|Difference
!width=40|BP
!width=40|Points
|- bgcolor=#ccffcc align=center
|align=left| 
|3||3||0||0||17||119||48||+71||2||14
|- bgcolor=#ffffcc align=center
|align=left| 
|3||2||0||1||27||147||47||+100||3||11
|- bgcolor=#ffcccc align=center
|align=left| 
|3||1||0||2||5||47||151||–104||0||4
|- align=center
|align=left| 
|3||0||0||3||4||44||111||–67||1||1
|}

Pool D
{| class="wikitable"
|-
!width=165|Team
!width=40|Played
!width=40|Won
!width=40|Drawn
!width=40|Lost
!width=40|Tries
!width=40|For
!width=40|Against
!width=40|Difference
!width=40|BP
!width=40|Points
|- bgcolor=#ccffcc align=center
|align=left| 
|3||3||0||0||11||85||39||+46||2||14
|- bgcolor=#ffffcc align=center
|align=left| 
|3||2||0||1||13||104||54||+50||3||11
|- bgcolor=#ffcccc align=center
|align=left| 
|3||1||0||2||4||48||81||–33||0||4
|- align=center
|align=left| 
|3||0||0||3||7||47||110||–63||1||1
|}

Knockout stage

13th-16th Places Playoffs

9th-12th Place Playoffs

5th-8th Places Playoffs

1st place playoffs

Semi-finals

3rd place playoffs

Final

See also

2008 IRB Junior World Rugby Trophy

External links
Official website

2008
2008 rugby union tournaments for national teams
2007–08 in Welsh rugby union
International rugby union competitions hosted by Wales
2008 in youth sport